"Spicy" is a song by American singer-songwriter Ty Dolla Sign featuring from fellow American singer and rapper Post Malone. It was released as the third single from the former's third studio album, Featuring Ty Dolla Sign, on October 21, 2020. The single was released only two days before the album. The song marks the second collaboration between the artists, after the chart-topping "Psycho" in 2018. On January 29, 2021, Ty Dolla Sign released the remix of the song, which also features Malone and new features from Colombian singer J Balvin and American rappers YG and Tyga.

Background
In an Instagram post, Ty Dolla Sign wrote about his collaboration with Post Malone on the song:You know, that magic that only that person could bring to the song. And "Spicy" was no different. This song needed Post's frequency. Plus, we were overdue for another hit after "Psycho." I'm just grateful that he lent his frequency to this song because we DEFINITELY got another one on our hands. Shout out to my brother Posty!

Composition
The song features a "hypnotic and lively" instrumental, with a "heavy low end groove topped with swirling synths and a delicate acoustic guitar loop". In "hazy" vocals, Ty Dolla Sign and Post Malone "sing-rap horny strip-club stuff."

Music video
The official music video for the song was directed by James Larese and was released on November 25, 2020. The Western-inspired visual features narration from Snoop Dogg, who begins a story of how Ty Dolla Sign gets his lover back from a gang of outlaws at the start of the video. The video is set in the Wild West, but features futuristic elements such as robotic horses. Ty ends up at a saloon, where he finds Post Malone in a card game with outlaws. He and Post team up to start a brawl with the gang, and he sees their leader holding his girlfriend hostage. Ty Dolla Sign transforms his guitar case into a bazooka, kills him and rescues the woman.

Charts

References

2020 singles
2020 songs
2021 singles
Atlantic Records singles
Ty Dolla Sign songs
Post Malone songs
J Balvin songs
YG (rapper) songs
Tyga songs
Songs written by Ty Dolla Sign
Songs written by Post Malone
Songs written by J Balvin
Songs written by YG (rapper)
Songs written by Tyga
Songs written by Westen Weiss